Paul Engelmann (14 June 1891 – 5 February 1965) was a Viennese architect who is now best known for his friendship with the philosopher Ludwig Wittgenstein between 1916 and 1928, and for being Wittgenstein's partner in the design and building of the Stonborough House, in Vienna. His Letters from Ludwig Wittgenstein With a Memoir was translated by L. Furtmüller and published in 1967 by Basil Blackwell.

Education
Engelmann was born at Olmütz (Olomouc) in 1891, and studied with the modernist architect Adolf Loos in Vienna. He was supposedly Loos's favourite pupil. He was private secretary to Karl Kraus.

Career
After the end of World War I, Engelmann maintained an active career as an architect in Europe and designed private houses in various cities. His work followed Loos’ design principles, examples including the Stonborough House, in Vienna (1926–28), the Vladimir Müller residence in Olmütz (1926–28) and the Yedlin residence on Mount Carmel, Haifa (1936).

The Stonborough House

In November 1925, Wittgenstein's sister Margaret Stonborough-Wittgenstein commissioned Engelmann, to design and build a large town house in Vienna in the Kundmanngasse. Wittgenstein showed a great interest in the project and in Engelmann's plans. He convinced Engelmann that he could realise his sister's intentions much better and was eventually asked to be the architect of the house.

After Vienna
Engelmann emigrated to the Palestine region in 1934. He later settled in Tel Aviv, Israel, where he died in 1965. He dedicated less time to his architectural work, instead focusing on writing about his experiences with Loos, Kraus and Wittgenstein, but in 1947 he designed the interiors of the Jordanian Parliament and the throne hall of King Abdulla in Amman, Jordan.

References

1891 births
1965 deaths
Austrian architects
Czechoslovak emigrants to Mandatory Palestine
People from Olomouc
People from the Margraviate of Moravia
Jews in Mandatory Palestine
Israeli people of Czech-Jewish descent
Czech architects
Jewish architects
Israeli architects